Nukus ( / ;  / ;  / ) is the sixth-largest city in Uzbekistan and the capital of the autonomous Republic of Karakalpakstan. The population of Nukus as of January 1, 2022 was 329,100. The Amu Darya river passes west of the town. Administratively, Nukus is a district-level city, that includes the urban-type settlement Karatau.

The city is best known for its world-class Nukus Museum of Art.

History
The name Nukus comes from the old tribal name of the Karakalpaks, Nukus. Nukus developed from a small settlement in 1932 into a large, modern Soviet city with broad avenues and big public buildings by the 1950s.

The city's isolation made it host to the Red Army's Chemical Research Institute, a major research and testing center for chemical weapons. In 2002 the United States Department of Defense dismantled the Chemical Research Institute, the major research and testing site for the Novichok agent, under a $6 million Cooperative Threat Reduction program.

Turtkul city became the administrative center of the autonomous region of Karakalpakstan when the Soviet authorities came to power. However in the 20s, Amu Darya, which was 12 km from the River Bank, was threatened with the flush of Turtkul, which caused the core of Karakalpakstan to move towards Nukus. In 1932 the city was officially founded. It is the center of Karakalpakstan's economy, government, politics and culture.

Sights

Nukus is host to the Nukus Museum of Art (also known as the State Art Museum of the Republic of Karakalpakstan, named after Igor Savitsky) and State Museum. The State Museum houses the usual collection of artifacts recovered from archaeological investigations, traditional jewelry, costumes and musical instruments, displays of the area's now vanished or endangered flora and fauna, and on the Aral Sea issue. The Art Museum is noted for its collection of modern Russian and Uzbek art from 1918 to 1935. Stalin tried his best to eliminate all non Soviet art from this period, and sent most of the artists to the gulag. Both Savitsky himself and the collection at Nukus survived because the city's remoteness limited the influence and reach of Soviet authorities. The documentary film The Desert of Forbidden Art is all about the collection and its history.

Nukus is also home to the Amet and Ayimkhan Shamuratovs house museum, a hub for Karakalpak music and oral culture. The museum's collection represents personal belongings of the Shamuratovs including stage clothes, photographs, manuscripts, books, letters.

Nukus and the surrounding area is serviced by Nukus Airport.

Climate
Nukus experiences a cold desert climate (Köppen BWk) with summers that are long, dry and very hot, and winters that are short, though quite cold and snowy, having a very dry type of a continental climate. Due to the Aral Sea and Amu Darya drying up, the climate has become much hotter and drier since 1960, and health conditions resulting from salt and other chemicals in the air have become more common.

Economy

In 2019, the Nukus free economic zone (FEZ) was established to "attract direct foreign and domestic investments for the production of import-substituting products that are in demand on foreign markets". This FEZ will be in place for 30 years.

Politics
Nukus is the capital of the autonomous Republic of Karakalpakstan region of Uzbekistan. There has been concern raised over a lack of due process in legal trials in the city. In July 2022, thousands of people protested in the city over a proposed constitutional amendment that would make Karakalpakstan no longer autonomous. 19 people were killed by security forces.

Notable people 
 Azatbek Omurbekov (born 1983) - Butcher of Bucha.
 Salijon Abdurahmanov (born 1950) journalist and former prisoner of conscience.

See also
Nukus Museum of Art
Nukus Airport

References

 
Populated places in Karakalpakstan
Cities in Uzbekistan
Populated places established in 1932
1932 establishments in the Soviet Union